Pia de' Tolomei is a tragedia lirica (tragic opera) in two acts by Gaetano Donizetti.  Salvadore Cammarano wrote the Italian libretto after Bartolomeo Sestini's verse novella Pia de' Tolomei, which was based on Canto V, vv. 130–136 from Dante's narrative poem The Divine Comedy part 2: Purgatorio. It premiered on 18 February 1837 at the Teatro Apollo in Venice.

Composition history
Background

Pia de' Tolomei is a tragic figure whom Dante encountered in Purgatory. Her story was so familiar to Dante's readers that an understated allusion was enough to call it to mind:

Performance history 

19th century

Donizetti agreed to write Pia de' Tolomei for the Teatro La Fenice in Venice and began composing it in October 1836 before the premiere of L'assedio di Calais  in Naples in November. In early December he left for Venice, but was delayed in Genoa by an eighteen-day quarantine due to a cholera epidemic and while there learned that the Teatro La Fenice had been destroyed by fire on 12 December. Since the directors felt the production would have to be canceled, they wanted him to take a substantial reduction in his fee. After this news Donizetti originally intended to return to Naples, but having just signed a contract to purchase a new home prior to leaving Naples, he changed his mind and decided to proceed directly to Venice to see what could be done. After arriving he was able to reach an agreement with La Fenice's management and its impresario, Alessandro Lanari, to perform Pia de' Tolomei in early February at another theatre in Venice, the Teatro Apollo, where La Fenice's season had been transferred.

The opening was delayed when bass Celestino Salvatori, who had been scheduled to sing the role of Nello della Pietra, became ill, and Donizetti had to rewrite the part for the baritone Giorgio Ronconi. The opera finally opened on 18 February, and Donizetti wrote a letter to a friend that "Pia pleased altogether, except for the first act finale." In fact, that finale had been "greeted with whistles of disapproval". Donizetti revised the opera with Cammarano's help in the spring of 1837, and this version was performed on 31 July 1837 in the Adriatic resort of Sinigaglia. Donizetti revised it a second time with the help of an unknown librettist for the Teatro Argentina in Rome, where it was performed in May 1838 with the soprano Giuseppina Strepponi (the future wife of Verdi) in the title role.

It was finally performed on 30 September 1838 in Naples, but under the condition that Pia did not die. It was not well received over its ten performances, and was revived at the end of 1839.
The opera was performed in Milan and Florence in 1839 (as well as some other Italian theatres), Barcelona in 1844, Lisbon in 1847, and Malta in 1854–1855, after which it fell from the repertory.

20th century and beyond

A revival took place on 3 September 1967 at the Teatro dei Rinnovati in Siena, a production which was also staged in Bologna in March of the following year. It was given a concert performance on 26 February 1978 at the Queen Elizabeth Hall in London. Among other performances, the opera was staged at La Fenice in 2005, by English Touring Opera in 2016, and  received its US premiere at the Spoleto Festival in May 2018.

Roles

Synopsis 
Place: Siena
Time: 1260
Ghino has fallen in love with Pia, wife of his cousin Nello, a Ghibelline lord. When she refuses his love, as revenge Ghino informs Nello that he has discovered a secret message (found by the mischievous servant Ubaldo) proving that Pia has an adulterous relation.  It tells of a secret meeting to be held between Pia and her lover. 
Ghino goes to the place described in the message, and does find Pia with a man. Ghino does not know that the man is not her lover but her brother Rodrigo, a Guelph, whom she is helping to escape from Nello's prison. Rodrigo manages to escape, but Pia is captured and imprisoned.

Ghino again offers her his love, promising to give her freedom in exchange; but the woman still refuses. Impressed by Pia's virtue and informed of the true identity of her alleged lover, Ghino repents and, mortally wounded in battle, reveals the truth to Nello.  However, Nello had already given to his servant Ubaldo the order to kill Pia by poisoning. Nello rushes to stop the servant, but it is too late: he finds his wife is dying. On her deathbed, Pia forgives her husband, and effects a reconciliation between him and Rodrigo.

[When it was finally accepted for performances at the Teatro San Carlo in Naples on 30 September 1838, it was with the requirement that Pia not die.]

Recordings

References
Notes

Cited sources
 Alighieri, Dante. La Commedia secondo l'antica vulgata a cura di Giorgio Petrocchi. Edizione Nazionale a cura della Società Dantesca Italiana. [Milano]: Arnoldo Mondadori Editore, 1966–1967.
 Ashbrook, William (1982). Donizetti and His Operas. Cambridge University Press., .
 Ashbrook, William (1998), "Pia de' Tolomei" in Stanley Sadie, (Ed.), The New Grove Dictionary of Opera, Vol. Three, pp. 997–998. London: Macmillan Publishers, Inc.    
 Ashbrook, William and Hibberd, Sarah (2001), "Gaetano Donizetti", in Amanda Holden (Ed.), The New Penguin Opera Guide. New York: Penguin Putnam. .
 Barwick, Linda (2005), “An ample and very poetical narrative”: the vicissitudes of “La Pia” between the literary and oral traditions. In M. Baker, F. Coassin & D. Glenn (Eds.), Flinders Dante Conferences, 2002 & 2004 (pp. 77–101). Adelaide: Lythrum Press. 
 Black, John (1982), Donizetti’s Operas in Naples, 1822—1848. London: The Donizetti Society.
 Cammarano, Salvatore. Pia de' Tolomei: Tragedia lirica in two acts. Music: Gaetano Donizetti, libretto by Salvatore Cammarano. In «Tutti i libretti di Donizetti», a cura di Egidio Saracino. Milano: Garzanti, 1993, pp. 893–907. Also published electronically at <http://www.karadar.it/Librettos/donizetti_pia.html> (accessed 20 February 2005).
 Marenco, Carlo. Tragedie inedite di Carlo Marenco, aggiuntevi la Pia de' Tolomei, tragedia. Firenze,: Felice Le Monnier, 1856.
 Osborne, Charles (1994), The Bel Canto Operas of Rossini, Donizetti, and Bellini. Portland, Oregon: Amadeus Press. .
 Sestini, Bartolomeo. La Pia: una leggenda romantica. Roma: Stamperia Ajani, 1822. 
 Smart, Mary Ann; Budden, Julian (2001), "Donizetti, (Domenico) Gaetano (Maria)" in Stanley Sadie, (Ed.), The New Grove Dictionary of Music and Musicians, 2nd edition. London: Macmillan.  (hardcover).  (eBook).
 Weinstock, Herbert (1963), Donizetti and the World of Opera in Italy, Paris, and Vienna in the First Half of the Nineteenth Century. New York: Pantheon Books. .

Online sources
Libretto(Italian) 
Programme for the 2005 production of Pia de' Tolomei at the Teatro La Fenice with essays and illustrations (Italian)

External links 
 

Italian-language operas
Operas by Gaetano Donizetti
Operas
1837 operas
Operas based on novels
Operas set in Italy
Works based on Purgatorio
Operas based on works by Dante Alighieri